Church windows, also referred to as chocolate marshmallow logs, stained glass windows or cathedral windows are a multicolored dessert confection, popular in the United States. Ingredients include chocolate, butter, nuts (often walnuts or pecans), mini-colored marshmallows and shredded coconut.

See also
Coconut candy

References

Chocolate desserts